Wyndell Dickerson (born May 12, 1964) is a sprinter who represents the United States Virgin Islands. He competed in the men's 200 metres at the 1992 Summer Olympics. In 2019, he was inducted into the Virgin Islands Track & Field Federation Hall of Fame.

References

External links
 

1964 births
Living people
Athletes (track and field) at the 1992 Summer Olympics
United States Virgin Islands male sprinters
Olympic track and field athletes of the United States Virgin Islands
Place of birth missing (living people)